Rudolf Stähelin, surname also spelled Staehelin (28 July 1875, Basel – 26 March 1943, Basel) was a Swiss internist.

He studied medicine at the Universities of Basel, Tübingen and Munich, obtaining his doctorate at Basel in 1901. He briefly served as an assistant physician at the Civic Hospital in Basel, then was a lecturer at the Universities of Basel (from 1902), Göttingen (1906) and Berlin (from 1907). From 1911 until 1943, he was a professor of internal medicine and director of the medical clinic at Basel.

His research involved studies on tuberculosis, respiratory, circulatory, metabolic and infectious diseases. With Gustav von Bergmann, he published the second edition of the Handbuch der inneren Medizin (1925-1931).

Selected works 
 Fortschritte der Hochgebirgsphysiologie, 1929 – On high altitude physiology.
 Spezielle Pathologie und Therapie der Infektionskrankheiten, 1934 – Special pathology and therapy for infectious diseases.
 Pro et Contra der Sulfanilamidtherapie, 1942 – Pros and cons associated with sulfanilamide therapy.
 Ermüdung und Krankheit, 1942 – Fatigue and disease.

References 

1875 births
1943 deaths
People from Basel-Stadt
Academic staff of the University of Basel
Swiss internists